The Battle of Veracruz may refer to:
 Attack on Veracruz (1683) pirate attack on Veracruz in Spanish Colonial Mexico
 Battle of Veracruz (1838), a French attack on Veracruz during the Pastry War
 Siege of Veracruz (1847), an American siege on the Mexican city of Veracruz during the Mexican-American War
 Siege of Veracruz, either of two rebel attacks on Veracruz during the Mexican Reform War of 1857–1861
 Battle of Veracruz (1914), an American attack on Veracruz during the United States occupation of Veracruz